Gerlachs park is a park in Malmö, Sweden, located along the street Gerlachsgatan. In Medieval times, this was one of Malmö's execution sites, and it was also used for witch burnings from 1543 to 1663. The site was later used as a burial ground for poor soldiers of Malmö garrison (1809–1870) and for prisoners from Malmö Castle (1827–1891).

References

Parks in Malmö